George Henry Stimpson (25 January 1910 – 1983) was an English professional footballer who played in the Football League for Exeter City, Mansfield Town and Notts County.

References

1910 births
1983 deaths
English footballers
Association football defenders
English Football League players
Notts County F.C. players
Rhyl F.C. players
Exeter City F.C. players
Mansfield Town F.C. players